In Greek mythology the Perseides, "those born of Perseus" and Andromeda, are the members of the House of Perseus, descended, according to Valerius Flaccus through Perse and Perses.

After the Greek Dark Ages, tradition recalled that Perseus and his descendants the Perseides had ruled Tiryns in Mycenaean times, while the allied branch descended from Perseus'  great-uncle Proetus ruled in Argos.

Perseus and Andromeda had seven sons: Perses, Alcaeus, Heleus, Mestor, Sthenelus, Electryon, and Cynurus, and two daughters, Gorgophone, and Autochthe. Perses was left in Aethiopia and was believed to have become an ancestor of the Persians. The other descendants ruled Mycenae from Electryon down to Eurystheus, after whom Atreus got the kingdom. The most renowned of the Perseides was Greece's greatest hero, Heracles son of Zeus and Alcmene, daughter of Electryon.

Notes 

Characters in Greek mythology